
Year 407 (CDVII) was a common year starting on Tuesday (link will display the full calendar) of the Julian calendar. At the time, it was known as the Year of the Consulship of Honorius and Theodosius(or, less frequently, year 1160 Ab urbe condita). The denomination 407 for this year has been used since the early medieval period, when the Anno Domini calendar era became the prevalent method in Europe for naming years.

Events 
 By place 

 Roman Empire 
 Gratian, Roman usurper, is installed as emperor after the death of Marcus. According to Orosius, he is a native Briton of the urban aristocracy. 
 Gratian is assassinated and Constantine III, a general (magister militum), declares himself Roman emperor. To extend his dominion over Gaul and Spain, he takes practically all the Roman garrisons from Britain and crosses the English Channel. Constantine occupies Arles and establishes tenuous authority over Gaul, sharing control with marauding "barbarians". This is generally seen as the beginning of Rome's withdrawal from Britain.
 End of Roman rule in Britain: After 360 years of occupation, the local regional British-Roman leaders raise their own levies for defence against Saxon sea rovers. They cultivate oysters, having learned the technique from the Romans. 

 China 
 Liu Bobo (Xia Wuliedi) founds the state of Xia, and claims the title "Heavenly Prince" (Tian Wang).

Births 
 Wen Di, Chinese emperor of the Liu Song Dynasty (d. 453)

Deaths 
 Fu Xunying, empress of the Xianbei state Later Yan
 Gratian, Roman usurper
 John Chrysostom, archbishop of Constantinople
 Marcus, Roman usurper
 Maria, empress consort and wife of Honorius
 Murong Xi, emperor of the Xianbei state Later Yan (b. 385)
 Victricius, missionary and bishop of Rouen (approximate date)

References